"If You're Thinking You Want a Stranger (There's One Coming Home)" is a song written by Blake Mevis and David Wills, and recorded by American country music artist George Strait.  It was released in January 1982 as the third and final single from his debut album Strait Country.  It peaked at number 3 in the United States, while it was a number 2 in Canada.

Critical reception
Kevin John Coyne of Country Universe gave the song a B− grade, saying that if Strait's voice wasn't so "distinctive and familiar, you could be forgiven for mistaking this for Johnny Lee’s, "Lookin' for Love." Billboard reviewed the song favorably, saying that "Strait's got another winner in this lively promise of changing ways."

Charts

Weekly charts

Year-end charts

References

1982 singles
1981 songs
George Strait songs
Songs written by David Wills (singer)
Songs written by Blake Mevis
MCA Records singles